Thioalkalimicrobium is a defunct bacterial genus within the Gammaproteobacteria. All 4 species in the genus were reclassified to the genus Thiomicrospira in 2017.

References

Further reading 
 
 
 
 
 

Piscirickettsiaceae
Bacteria genera